With Open Arms is a 2017 French-Belgian comedy film directed by Philippe de Chauveron.

Cast
 Christian Clavier - Jean-Étienne Fougerole
 Ary Abittan - Babik
 Elsa Zylberstein - Daphné Fougerole
  - Erwan Berruto
  - Isabelle Cheroy

References

External links 

2017 films
French comedy films
Belgian comedy films
2010s French-language films
2017 comedy films
Films directed by Philippe de Chauveron
Films about Romani people
Films about racism in France
2010s French films